Tjejvasan is a cross-country skiing event in Sweden, running from Oxberg to Mora, a distance of 30 kilometers. It is only open to female skiers. Being annual, the first event was first held in 1988.

Winners
Winners throughout the years.
 1988 – Karin Värnlund, IFK Mora
 1989 – Marie Johansson, Dala Järna IK
 1990 – cancelled because of lack of snow
 1991 – Anna Frithioff, Kvarnsvedens GoIF
 1992 – Anna Frithioff, Kvarnsvedens GoIF
 1993 – Carina Görlin, Hudiksvalls IF
 1994 – Marie Helene Östlund, Hudiksvalls IF
 1995 – Marie Helene Östlund, Hudiksvalls IF
 1996 – Kerrin Petty, IFK Mora
 1997 – Kerrin Petty, Stockviks SF
 1998 – Bente Martinsen, Norway
 1999 – Elin Ek, Bergeforsens SK
 2000 – Annika Evaldsson, IFK Mora
 2001 – Anita Moen, Norway
 2002 – Emelie Öhrstig, Stockviks SF
 2003 – Ulrica Persson, SK Bore
 2004 – Hilde Gjermundshaug Pedersen, Norway
 2005 – Sofia Bleckur, IK Jarl
 2006 – Elin Ek, IFK Mora
 2007 – Susanne Nyström, Piteå Elit SK
 2008 – Susanne Nyström, Piteå Elit SK
 2009 – Susanne Nyström, Piteå Elit SK
 2010 – Susanne Nyström, IFK Mora
 2011 – Jenny Hansson, Östersunds SK
 2012 – Susanne Nyström, Laisvalls SK
 2013 – Susanne Nyström, Laisvalls SK
 2014 – Sofia Bleckur, IFK Mora
 2015 – Laila Kveli, Norway
 2016 – Britta Johansson Norgren, Sollefteå SK
 2017 – Britta Johansson Norgren, Sollefteå SK
 2018 - Kateřina Smutná, Czech Republic
 2019 – Britta Johansson Norgren, Sollefteå SK
 2020 - Britta Johansson Norgren, Sollefteå Skidor IF
 2021 – Lina Korsgren, Åre LSK
 2022 - Britta Johansson Norgren, Sollefteå Skidor IF
 2023 – Ida Dahl, Team Engcon

See also
 Tjejmilen
 Tjejtrampet
 Vasaloppet

References

External links
The event at SVT's open archive 

1988 establishments in Sweden
February sporting events
Recurring sporting events established in 1988
Women's sports competitions in Sweden
Cross-country skiing competitions in Sweden